Colwell may refer to:

Places
Colwell, Northumberland, England
Colwell Bay, Isle of Wight, England
Colwell, Iowa, United States

Other uses
Colwell (surname), a surname

See also